Alberto Parodi was a Chilean businessman, best known as the first president of the football club Colo-Colo from 1925 to 1926.

References

Year of birth missing
Year of death missing
Place of birth missing
Place of death missing
Chilean businesspeople